Swans are birds of the family Anatidae within the genus Cygnus. The swans' closest relatives include the geese and ducks. Swans are grouped with the closely related geese in the subfamily Anserinae where they form the tribe Cygnini. Sometimes, they are considered a distinct subfamily, Cygninae. 

There are six living and many extinct species of swan; in addition, there is a species known as the coscoroba swan which is no longer considered one of the true swans. Swans usually mate for life, although "divorce" sometimes occurs, particularly following nesting failure, and if a mate dies, the remaining swan will take up with another. The number of eggs in each clutch ranges from three to eight.

Etymology and terminology
The English word swan, akin to the German , Dutch  and Swedish , is derived from Indo-European root  ('to sound, to sing'). An adult male is a cob, from Middle English  (leader of a group); an adult female is a pen.

Description

Swans are the largest extant members of the waterfowl family Anatidae, and are among the largest flying birds. Compared to the closely related geese, they are much larger and have proportionally larger feet and necks. Adults also have a patch of unfeathered skin between the eyes and bill. The sexes are alike in plumage, but males are generally bigger and heavier than females. The biggest species of swan ever was the extinct Cygnus falconeri, a flightless giant swan known from fossils found on the Mediterranean islands of Malta and Sicily. Its disappearance is thought to have resulted from extreme climate fluctuations or the arrival of superior predators and competitors.

The Northern Hemisphere species of swan have pure white plumage, but the Southern Hemisphere species are mixed black and white. The Australian black swan (Cygnus atratus) is completely black except for the white flight feathers on its wings; the chicks of black swans are light grey. The South American black-necked swan has a white body with a black neck.

Swans' legs are normally a dark blackish grey colour, except for the South American black-necked swan, which has pink legs. Bill colour varies: the four subarctic species have black bills with varying amounts of yellow, and all the others are patterned red and black. Although birds do not have teeth, swans, like other Anatidae, have beaks with serrated edges that look like small jagged 'teeth' as part of their beaks used for catching and eating aquatic plants and algae, but also molluscs, small fish, frogs, and worms. In the mute swan and black-necked swan, both sexes have a fleshy lump at the base of their bills on the upper mandible, known as knob, which is larger in males, and is condition dependent, changing seasonally.

Distribution and movements

Swans are generally found in temperate environments, rarely occurring in the tropics. A group of swans is called a bevy or a wedge in flight. Four (or five) species occur in the Northern Hemisphere, one species is found in Australia, one extinct species was found in New Zealand and the Chatham Islands, and one species is distributed in southern South America. They are absent from tropical Asia, Central America, northern South America and the entirety of Africa. One species, the mute swan, has been introduced to North America, Australia and New Zealand.

Several species are migratory, either wholly or partly so. The mute swan is a partial migrant, being resident over areas of Western Europe but wholly migratory in Eastern Europe and Asia. The whooper swan and tundra swan are wholly migratory, and the trumpeter swans are almost entirely migratory. There is some evidence that the black-necked swan is migratory over part of its range, but detailed studies have not established whether these movements are long or short range migration.

Behaviour

Swans feed in water and on land. They are almost entirely herbivorous, although they may eat small amounts of aquatic animals. In the water, food is obtained by up-ending or dabbling, and their diet is composed of the roots, tubers, stems and leaves of aquatic and submerged plants.

Swans famously mate for life, and typically bond even before they reach sexual maturity. Trumpeter swans, for example, who can live as long as 24 years and only start breeding at the age of 4–7, form monogamous pair bonds as early as 20 months. "Divorce", though rare, does occur; one study of mute swans showing a 3% rate for pairs that breed successfully and 9% for pairs that do not. The pair bonds are maintained year-round, even in gregarious and migratory species like the tundra swan, which congregate in large flocks in the wintering grounds. 

Swans' nests are on the ground near water and about a metre across. Unlike many other ducks and geese, the male helps with the nest construction, and will also take turns incubating the eggs. Alongside the whistling ducks, swans are the only anatids that will do this. Average egg size (for the mute swan) is 113×74 mm, weighing 340 g, in a clutch size of 4 to 7, and an incubation period of 34–45 days.
Swans are highly protective of their nests. They will viciously attack anything that they perceive as a threat to their chicks, including humans. One man was suspected to have drowned in such an attack. Swans' intraspecific aggressive behaviour is shown more frequent than interspecific behaviour for food and shelter. The aggression with other species is shown more in Bewick's swans.

Systematics and evolution

Evidence suggests that the genus Cygnus evolved in Europe or western Eurasia during the Miocene, spreading all over the Northern Hemisphere until the Pliocene. When the southern species branched off is not known. The mute swan apparently is closest to the Southern Hemisphere Cygnus; its habits of carrying the neck curved (not straight) and the wings fluffed (not flush) as well as its bill color and knob indicate that its closest living relative is the black swan. Given the biogeography and appearance of the subgenus Olor it seems likely that these are of a more recent origin, as evidence shows by their modern ranges (which were mostly uninhabitable during the last ice age) and great similarity between the taxa.

Phylogeny

Species
Genus Cygnus

The coscoroba swan (Coscoroba coscoroba) from South America, the only species in its genus, is apparently not a true swan. Its phylogenetic position is not fully resolved; it is in some aspects more similar to geese and shelducks.

Fossil record
 

The fossil record of the genus Cygnus is quite impressive, although allocation to the subgenera is often tentative; as indicated above, at least the early forms probably belong to the C. olor – Southern Hemisphere lineage, whereas the Pleistocene taxa from North America would be placed in Olor. A number of prehistoric species have been described, mostly from the Northern Hemisphere. In the Mediterranean, the leg bones of the giant swan (C. falconeri) were found on the islands of Malta and Sicily; it may have been over 2 meters from tail to bill, which was taller (though not heavier) than the contemporary local dwarf elephants (Palaeoloxodon falconeri).

 Subgenus Chenopis
†New Zealand swan, Cygnus sumnerensis, an extinct species related to the black swan of Australia
 Other subgenera (see above):
†Cygnus csakvarensis Lambrecht 1933 [Cygnus csákvárensis Lambrecht 1931a nomen nudum; Cygnanser csakvarensis (Lambrecht 1933) Kretzoi 1957; Olor csakvarensis (Lambrecht 1933) Mlíkovský 1992b] (Late Miocene of Hungary)
†Cygnus mariae Bickart 1990 (Early Pliocene of Wickieup, U.S.)
†Cygnus verae Boev 2000 (Early Pliocene of Sofia, Bulgaria)
†Cygnus liskunae (Kuročkin 1976) [Anser liskunae Kuročkin 1976] (Middle Pliocene of western Mongolia)
†Cygnus hibbardi Brodkorb 1958 (?Early Pleistocene of Idaho, U.S.)
†Cygnus sp. Louchart et al. 1998 (Early Pleistocene of Dursunlu, Turkey)
†Giant swan (Cygnus falconeri) Parker 1865 sensu Livezey 1997a [Cygnus melitensis Falconer 1868; Palaeocygnus falconeri (Parker 1865) Oberholser 1908] (Middle Pleistocene of Malta and Sicily, Mediterranean)
†Cygnus paloregonus Cope 1878 [Anser condoni Schufeldt 1892; Cygnus matthewi Schufeldt 1913] (Middle Pleistocene of west-central U.S.)
†Dwarf swan (Cygnus equitum) Bate 1916 sensu Livezey 1997 [Anser equitum (Bate 1916) Brodkorb 1964; Cygnus (Olor) equitum Bate 1916 sensu Northcote 1988a] (Middle – Late Pleistocene of Malta and Sicily, Mediterranean)
†Cygnus lacustris (De Vis 1905) [Archaeocycnus lacustris De Vis 1905] (Late Pleistocene of the Lake Eyre region, Australia)
†Cygnus sp. (Pleistocene of Australia)
†Cygnus atavus (Fraas 1870) Mlíkovský 1992 [Anas atava Fraas 1870; Anas cygniformis Fraas 1870; Palaelodus steinheimensis Fraas 1870; Anser atavus (Fraas 1870) Lambrecht 1933; Anser cygniformis (Fraas 1870) Lambrecht 1933]
 Other genera
† Annakacygna

The supposed fossil swans "Cygnus" bilinicus and "Cygnus" herrenthalsi were, respectively, a stork and some large bird of unknown affinity (due to the bad state of preservation of the referred material).

In culture

European motifs
Many of the cultural aspects refer to the mute swan of Europe. Perhaps the best known story about a swan is the fable "The Ugly Duckling". Swans are often a symbol of love or fidelity because of their long-lasting, apparently monogamous relationships. See Wagner's famous swan-related operas Lohengrin and Parsifal.

As food
Swan meat was regarded as a luxury food in England in the reign of Elizabeth I. A recipe for baked swan survives from that time: "To bake a Swan Scald it and take out the bones, and parboil it, then season it very well with Pepper, Salt and Ginger, then lard it, and put it in a deep Coffin of Rye Paste with store of Butter, close it and bake it very well, and when it is baked, fill up the Vent-hole with melted Butter, and so keep it; serve it in as you do the Beef-Pie."

The Illustrious Brotherhood of Our Blessed Lady,  a religious confraternity which existed in 's-Hertogenbosch in the late Middle Ages, had 'sworn members', also called 'swan-brethren' because they used to donate a swan for the yearly banquet.

Heraldics

Ancient Greece and Rome
Swans feature strongly in mythology. In Greek mythology, the story of Leda and the Swan recounts that Helen of Troy was conceived in a union of Zeus disguised as a swan and Leda, Queen of Sparta.

Other references in classical literature include the belief that, upon death, the mute swan would sing beautifully—hence the phrase swan song.

The mute swan is also one of the sacred birds of Apollo, whose associations stem both from the nature of the bird as a symbol of light, as well as the notion of a "swan song". The god is often depicted riding a chariot pulled by or composed of swans in his ascension from Delos.

In the second century, the Roman poet Juvenal made a sarcastic reference to a good woman being a "rare bird, as rare on earth as a black swan" (black swans being completely unknown in the Northern Hemisphere until Dutch explorers reached Australia in the 1600s), from which comes the Latin phrase  (rare bird).

‘Black Swan’ event
The Black Swan theory originates from Juvenal’s reference, leading to the black swan as a metaphor for something that could, in theory, exist, but does not. After the "discovery" of actual black swans, this became a metaphor or analogy for something, typically an unexpected event or outlier, that has an unforeseen significance.

Irish lore and poetry
The Irish legend of the Children of Lir is about a stepmother transforming her children into swans for 900 years.

In the legend The Wooing of Etain, the king of the Sidhe (subterranean-dwelling, supernatural beings) transforms himself and the most beautiful woman in Ireland, Etain, into swans to escape from the king of Ireland and Ireland's armies. The swan has recently been depicted on an Irish commemorative coin.

Swans are also present in Irish literature in the poetry of W.B. Yeats. "The Wild Swans at Coole" has a heavy focus on the mesmerising characteristics of the swan. Yeats also recounts the myth of Leda and the Swan in the poem of the same name.

Nordic lore
In Norse mythology, there are two swans that drink from the sacred Well of Urd in the realm of Asgard, home of the gods. According to the Prose Edda, the water of this well is so pure and holy that all things that touch it turn white, including this original pair of swans and all others descended from them. The poem Volundarkvida, or the Lay of Volund, part of the Poetic Edda, also features swan maidens.

In the Finnish epic Kalevala, a swan lives in the Tuoni river located in Tuonela, the underworld realm of the dead. According to the story, whoever killed a swan would perish as well. Jean Sibelius composed the Lemminkäinen Suite based on the Kalevala, with the second piece entitled Swan of Tuonela (Tuonelan joutsen). Today, five flying swans are the symbol of the Nordic countries; the whooper swan (Cygnus cygnus) is the national bird of Finland; and the mute swan is the national bird of Denmark.

Swan Lake ballet
The ballet Swan Lake is among the most canonic of classical ballets. Based on the 1875–76 score by Pyotr Ilyich Tchaikovsky, the most promulgated choreographic version was created by Marius Petipa and Lev Ivanov (1895), the premiere of which was danced by the Imperial Ballet at the Mariinsky Theater in St. Petersburg. The ballet's lead dual roles of Odette (white swan) / Odile (black swan) represent good and evil, and are among the most challenging roles created in Romantic classical ballet. The ballet is in the repertories of ballet companies around the world.

Christianity

A swan is one of the attributes of St. Hugh of Lincoln, based on the story of a swan who was devoted to him.

Spanish language literature
In Latin American literature, the Nicaraguan poet Rubén Darío (1867–1916) consecrated the swan as a symbol of artistic inspiration by drawing attention to the constancy of swan imagery in Western culture, beginning with the rape of Leda and ending with Wagner's Lohengrin. Darío's most famous poem in this regard is Blasón – "Coat of Arms" (1896), and his use of the swan made it a symbol for the Modernismo poetic movement that dominated Spanish language poetry from the 1880s until the First World War. Such was the dominance of Modernismo in Spanish language poetry that the Mexican poet Enrique González Martínez attempted to announce the end of Modernismo with a sonnet provocatively entitled, Tuércele el cuello al cisne – "Wring the Swan's Neck" (1910).

Hinduism

Swans are revered in Hinduism, and are compared to saintly persons whose chief characteristic is to be in the world without getting attached to it, just as a swan's feather does not get wet although it is in water. The Sanskrit word for swan is hamsa and the "Raja Hamsam" or the Royal Swan is the vehicle of Devi Saraswati, which symbolises the Sattva Guna or purity par excellence. The swan, if offered a mixture of milk and water, is said to be able to drink the milk alone. Therefore, Saraswati, the goddess of knowledge, is seen riding the swan because the swan thus symbolizes Viveka, i.e. prudence and discrimination between the good and the bad or between the eternal and the transient. This is seen as a great quality, as shown by this Sanskrit verse:

It is mentioned several times in the Vedic literature, and persons who have attained great spiritual capabilities are sometimes called Paramahamsa ("Supreme Swan") on account of their spiritual grace and ability to travel between various spiritual worlds. In the Vedas, swans are said to reside in the summer on Lake Manasarovar and migrate to Indian lakes for the winter. They are believed to possess some powers, such as the ability to eat pearls.

Indo-European religions
Swans are intimately associated with the divine twins in Indo-European religions, and it is thought that in Proto-Indo-European times, swans were a solar symbol associated with the divine twins and the original Indo-European sun goddess.

See also
 Royal Swans

References

External links

 Louchart, Antoine; Mourer-Chauviré, Cécile; Guleç, Erksin; Howell, Francis Clark & White, Tim D. (1998): L'avifaune de Dursunlu, Turquie, Pléistocène inférieur: climat, environnement et biogéographie. C. R. Acad. Sci. Paris IIA 327(5): 341–346. [French with English abridged version] 
A History of British Birds

Anserinae
Extant Miocene first appearances
 
Taxa named by François Alexandre Pierre de Garsault